MV Empire MacAndrew was a grain ship converted to become a Merchant Aircraft Carrier or MAC ship.

MV Empire MacKendrick was built at William Denny and Brothers Dumbarton Scotland under order from the Ministry of War Transport.  As a MAC ship, only her air crew and the necessary maintenance staff were naval personnel and she was operated by The Hain Steamship Company Ltd, St Ives, Cornwall.

After the war, the ship was converted back to a grain carrier, and eventually scrapped in China in 1970.

References

External links
  Empire MacAndrew FAA history

World War II aircraft carriers of the United Kingdom
Bulk carriers
Grain ships
Empire MacAndrew
Empire ships
1943 ships